Hortense Béwouda (born 19 October 1978) is a Cameroonian sprinter who specialized in the 400 metres.

Her personal best time is 51.04 seconds, achieved in June 2004 in Algiers. She currently holds the national record in 4 x 400 metres relay with 3:27.08 minutes, achieved together with teammates Mireille Nguimgo, Carole Kaboud Mebam and Delphine Atangana in August 2003 in Paris.

Achievements

External links
 

1978 births
Living people
Cameroonian female sprinters
Athletes (track and field) at the 2004 Summer Olympics
Olympic athletes of Cameroon
African Games silver medalists for Cameroon
African Games medalists in athletics (track and field)
Athletes (track and field) at the 2003 All-Africa Games
Olympic female sprinters